Marmaduke is a 2022 computer-animated comedy film directed by Mark Dippé, and co-directed by Phil Nibbelink, Youngki Lee, and Matt Whelan, based on the comic strip of the same name by Paul and Brad Anderson. It is the second feature-length film based on the strip following the 2010 live-action film. The film stars Pete Davidson as the voice of Marmaduke, along with J. K. Simmons and David Koechner. It was released by SC Films in international countries and on Netflix in the United States on May 6, 2022. The film was universally panned by critics and audiences, with criticisms going towards its animation, screenplay, story, characters and humor.

Plot
The Great Dane Marmaduke takes a cannonball dive from the second floor of his family's home into the backyard pool at his son Billy's birthday party, releasing a giant tidal wave. Barbara, Billy’s sister, records it on her phone and it goes viral. It comes to the attention of a world-renowned dog trainer, Guy, who offers to transform Marmaduke into a world-class show dog. At first, the family isn’t sure about Marmaduke entering dog competitions. When Phil, the family’s dad, learns that one million dollars is the prize money, he’s persuaded to make an agreement. Marmaduke goes into training and, after some initial resistance, starts to make progress.

Guy enters Marmaduke into a local dog show to test his skills at the competition level. During the preliminary setup, Marmaduke encounters an Afghan hound named Zeus, who entices him to eat prior to the competition, which makes him bloated. Marmaduke does his best to conceal the matter and struts onto the field with Guy. Before one lap around the field, Marmaduke releases voluminous clouds of noxious flatulence which envelopes the entire field. He soars through the air and lands backside down in the winner’s trophy and defecates in it, much to the horror of everyone.

Disgraced, Guy refuses to keep training Marmaduke. Deflated and dejected, Marmaduke runs away from home. As he’s running down the street, he sees the family cat, King Tut, in the middle of an intersection. Marmaduke saves the cat but has difficulty connecting with his character. Persuaded by King Tut, Marmaduke embarks on a trip around the world, performing heroic stunts along the way. His circumnavigation convinces Guy to take Marmaduke back on track for the World Dog Championship. Marmaduke encounters Zeus again at the competition with many other dog breeds. The competition consists of three challenges, but right after Marmaduke passes the second challenge, he lands on Guy, who is hospitalized. Without a trainer, his owners end up stepping in to coach him, allowing him to do the final challenge.

In the third and final challenge, the dogs perform a unique act, with Marmaduke and Billy doing a cowboy act with King Tut, pleasing the audience. Later, the judge's final results reveal Zeus as the winner. However, Marmaduke uncovers that Zeus' owner rigged the scores, leading Zeus to be disqualified. Zeus tries to take back the trophy, but Marmaduke stops him. He ends up knocking over a platform, causing Marmaduke to push his owners out of the way, getting crushed by the platform. Marmaduke is initially believed to be dead, but it is revealed that he is still alive, and he and his family live happily ever after. During the mid-credits scene, Zeus gets caught by security and is sent to the dog pound.

Voice cast
Pete Davidson as Marmaduke, a clumsy Great Dane
J. K. Simmons as Zeus, a selfish Afghan hound who is Marmaduke's nemesis
David Koechner as Phil Winslow, the patriarch of the Winslow family and Marmaduke's owner
Brian Hull as Guy Hilton, a dog trainer
Erin Fitzgerald as Barbara Winslow, the teenage daughter of Dottie and Phil 
Julie Nathanson as Dottie Winslow, matriarch of the Winslow family and Phil's wife
Terri Douglas as Billy Winslow, the younger son of Dottie and Phil
Mary Hart as the EntertainMutt Tonight Host 
Shelby Young as Shantrelle, a pink French poodle who is Marmaduke love interest
Stephen Stanton as King Tut, a Siamese cat
Andrew Morgado as Henri
Tania Gunadi as Cheerleader #1

Production
On October 23, 2017, it was announced that a CGI Marmaduke film was in development, to be written by Byron Kavanagh and directed by Mark A.Z. Dippé, who would produce alongside Dan Chuba and Matthew Joynes and Simon Crowe. In 2018, Andrews McMeel announced the involvement of cast members Pete Davidson as Marmaduke, J. K. Simmons as Marmaduke's rival Zeus, and David Koechner as Phil Winslow. The film's animation was provided by Dippé's company WonderWorld Studios, currently known as StoryBerry, who has facilities in Toronto, Shanghai, and Seoul, while main production was done by Legacy Classics in Los Angeles and One Cool Animation in Hong Kong.

Release
The film was first announced for a release in the second quarter of 2019. It was later slated for a release in 2020, but was delayed due to the COVID-19 pandemic. The film was acquired by Netflix in 2022. On April 8, 2022, Netflix released the film's trailer, and announced a May 6 release date.

Reception

Critical response
On Rotten Tomatoes, the film holds an approval rating of 0% based on 11 reviews, with an average rating of 2.4/10. Aurora Amidon of Paste Magazine criticized the formulaic and predictable plot, but praised the voice acting of Davidson, Simmons, and Koechner.

For his role in the film, Pete Davidson was nominated for Worst Actor at the Golden Raspberry Awards.

References

External links

2020s children's animated films
2022 computer-animated films
American computer-animated films
American children's comedy films
Chinese computer-animated films
Chinese children's films
Chinese comedy films
Canadian computer-animated films
Canadian children's animated films
Canadian comedy films
South Korean children's films
South Korean comedy films
English-language Netflix original films
Animated films about dogs
Animated films based on comics
Films based on American comics
Films based on comic strips
Animated films directed by Mark A.Z. Dippé
Films directed by Phil Nibbelink
Films postponed due to the COVID-19 pandemic
2020s English-language films
Marmaduke
2020s Canadian films
2020s American films